John Boyd Dunlop (born 10 October 1886 in Dunedin) was a chess player from New Zealand. He won the New Zealand Chess Championship in 1920–21 (after a play-off), 1921–22, 1922–23 (after a play-off), 1933–34 (after a play-off), 1938–39 and 1939–40.

Sources 
 John Boyd Dunlop on ChessGames.com
 See additional sources at New Zealand Chess Championship#References

New Zealand chess players
1886 births
Year of death missing